Minuscule 66 (in the Gregory-Aland numbering), ε 519 (von Soden), known as Codex Galei Londinensis, is a Greek minuscule manuscript of the New Testament, on paper leaves. Palaeographically it has been assigned to the 14th century.

Description 

The codex contains a complete text of the four Gospels on 298 leaves (size ). The text is written in one column per page, 21 lines per page.

There is also a division according to the Αmmonian Sections, with references to the Eusebian Canons.

Some scholia in the margin were added by a later hand.

Text 

The Greek text of the codex is a representative of the Byzantine text-type. Hermann von Soden classified it to the textual family Kr. Aland placed it in Category V. According to the Claremont Profile Method it belongs to the textual family Kr in Luke 1, 10, and 20.

History 

The manuscript once was in possession of Thomas Gale (1636-1702) – along with Lectionary 186 – hence name of the codex. It was examined and described by Mill, Scrivener, Gregory, and Hatch.

Scrivener collated its text in 1862, but publish posthumously in 1893 in his Adversaria critica sacra.

It is currently housed at the Trinity College (O. VIII. 3), at Cambridge.

See also 

 List of New Testament minuscules
 Biblical manuscript
 Textual criticism

References

Further reading 

  (as d)

External links 
 Minuscule 66 at the Trinity College Library Cambridge

Greek New Testament minuscules
14th-century biblical manuscripts